Dick Wallis (born September 25, 1931) was an American politician in the state of Wyoming. He served in the Wyoming House of Representatives as a member of the Republican Party. He attended Colorado State University and the University of Wyoming and is a rancher. His daughter Sue Wallis also served in the Wyoming House of Representatives.

References

1931 births
Living people
Republican Party members of the Wyoming House of Representatives
Ranchers from Wyoming
People from Albany County, Wyoming
20th-century American politicians